Dhanalakshmi or Dhana Laxmi, is one of the eight forms called Ashta Lakshmi of Lakshmi, the Hindu goddess of wealth, fortune and prosperity.

Dhana Lakshmi may also refer to:

People
G. V. Dhanalakshmi  is an Indian athlete
Dhanalakshmi Sekhar is an Indian athlete

Others
Dhanalakshmi (film) is a 1977 Indian Kannada language film directed by K. S. Sathyanarayana.